Mark O'Halloran is an Irish scriptwriter and actor. He is a native of Ennis, County Clare. He has written award-winning screenplays for the films Adam & Paul (in which he co-starred) and Garage and the RTÉ mini-series Prosperity. In 2019 he starred with Stephen Graham in the Channel 4 miniseries The Virtues, written and directed by Shane Meadows.

Awards and nominations
Awards
2005: Gijón International Film Festival Award for Best Actor - Adam & Paul
2006: Evening Standard British Award for Best Screenplay - Adam & Paul
2008: Irish Film and Television Award for Best Script for Film  - Garage
2008: Irish Film and Television Award for Best Script for Television - Prosperity
2008: Irish Playwrights and Screenwriters Guild Award for Best Television Script - Prosperity
Nominations
2004: Irish Film and Television Award Nomination for Best Script - Adam & Paul
2005: European Film Award Nomination for Best Screenwriter - Adam & Paul
2008: Irish Playwrights and Screenwriters Guild Award Nomination for Best Film - Garage

References

External links

Prosperity official site - RTE.ie

Year of birth missing (living people)
Living people
Irish male film actors
Irish screenwriters
Irish male screenwriters
21st-century Irish male writers
People from Ennis